John S. Gleason Jr. (February 11, 1915 – May 2, 1993)  was an American banker convicted of fraud in 1977. He previously served as the sixth Administrator of Veterans Affairs, from 1961 to 1965, and the National Commander of The American Legion from 1957 to 1958. He was a decorated World War II veteran, having received the Silver Star Medal, the Legion of Merit, and three Bronze Star Medals. After the war, he served as a senior officer in the United States Army Reserve.

Early life and education 
John Simon Gleason Jr. was born on February 11, 1915, in Chicago, Illinois. His father was employed at the First National Bank of Chicago where he would work when he grew older. He attended college at Notre Dame, graduating in 1940. Later in life, Gleason attended Harvard Business School, earning a second degree.

Military service 
Gleason interrupted his business career to enlist in the United States Army. By the end of World War II, he was a lieutenant colonel and had fought in the New Guinea and the Luzon campaigns with the 33d Infantry Division. Remaining active in the reserve during the Cold War, he was promoted to brigadier general.

The American Legion 
In 1946, Gleason organized the First National Bank of Chicago Post, No. 985, of The American Legion's Department of Illinois and was elected its first commander. His tenure as the National Commander of The American Legion from 1957 to 1958 is noted for its avocation of anti-communist education of young Americans.

Career 
In 1961, Gleason was appointed to the position of Administrator of Veterans Affairs. As such, he gave the national Veterans Day speech in 1964. In 1965, he returned to First National Bank of Chicago as vice president of business development. From 1970 to 1976, Gleason was chief executive officer of Mercantile Bank.

Bank fraud 
In 1977, Gleason plead guilty to charges of bank fraud for having used $500,000 of the Mercantile Bank's funds for personal use. He was convicted and sentenced to three years in prison, serving 18 months.

Later life 
Gleason later became a Roman Catholic deacon, serving as the first lay chaplain at Metropolitan Correctional Center. He also served as Chairman of the Board of Trustees of St. Francis Hospital in Evanston.

Personal life 
Gleason married Mary Jane Harrigan (1917-1998). The couple had six children: John S. "Jack" III, Daniel, Richard, Thomas, David, and Martin.

See also 
List of administrators of Veterans Affairs
List of people from Chicago
List of members of the American Legion

References

External links 
John S. Gleason Jr. at The Political Graveyard

1915 births
1993 deaths
20th-century Roman Catholics
American businesspeople convicted of crimes
American people convicted of fraud
American bank presidents
Businesspeople from Illinois
Catholics from Illinois
Harvard Business School alumni
Illinois Democrats
Kennedy administration personnel
Lyndon B. Johnson administration personnel
National Commanders of the American Legion
People from Chicago
Recipients of the Legion of Merit
Recipients of the Silver Star
American Roman Catholic deacons
United States Army reservists
United States Department of Veterans Affairs officials
University of Notre Dame alumni
United States Army personnel of World War II